Ryoichi "Rollin" Moriyama (sometimes credited as Roland Moriyama) was a Japanese character actor who was active in Hollywood from the 1940s through the 1980s.

Biography
Rollin was born in Fukushima, Japan, in 1907. He arrived in San Francisco, California, around 1919. His mother died when he was young, and he and his father eventually settled in the San Gabriel Valley in Los Angeles County, California.

During World War II, like many Japanese Americans, he and his family were imprisoned at Manzanar, a concentration camp in California's Sierra Nevada Mountains. After his release, he returned to Los Angeles, where he got parts in films like The Snow Creature and A Girl Named Tamiko.

Selected filmography
 Honky Tonk Freeway (1981)
 Foul Play (1978)
 Rabbit Test (1978)
 Sextette (1977)
 The Kentucky Fried Movie (1977)
 Walk Don't Run (1966)
 Morituri (1965)
 A Girl Named Tamiko (1962)
 The Gallant Hours (1960)
 Wake Me When It's Over (1960)
 Never So Few (1959)
 Battle of the Coral Sea (1959)
 The Crimson Kimono (1959)
 Sayonara (1957)
 20 Million Miles to Earth (1957)
 Between Heaven and Hell (1956)
 The Snow Creature (1954)

References

1907 births
1992 deaths
Japanese male film actors
American male actors of Japanese descent
American film actors of Asian descent
Actors from Fukushima Prefecture
Japanese emigrants to the United States
Japanese-American internees